Kaveh-ye Olya (also Romanized as Kāveh-ye ‘Olyā; also known as Deh Sefid (Persian: ده سفيد), also Romanized as Deh Sefīd) is a village in Kakavand-e Sharqi Rural District, Kakavand District, Delfan County, Lorestan Province, Iran. At the 2006 census, its population was 172, in 34 families.

References 

Towns and villages in Delfan County